Dejan Jeftić (born March 13, 1989) is a Bosnian professional basketball player who most recently played for Zlatibor of the ABA League Second Division.

Professional career 
On 13 January 2021, Jeftić signed for a Serbian team Zlatibor.

References

External links
Dejan Jeftic at eurobasket.com
Dejan Jeftic at fiba.com

1989 births
Living people
Basketball League of Serbia players
Bosnia and Herzegovina expatriate basketball people in Serbia
Bosnia and Herzegovina men's basketball players
Hacettepe Üniversitesi B.K. players
Lions de Genève players
Kapfenberg Bulls players
KK Bosna Royal players
KK Sloboda Tuzla players
KK Vršac players
KK Zlatibor players
KK Radnik Bijeljina players
Norrköping Dolphins players
Small forwards
Södertälje Kings players
Serbs of Bosnia and Herzegovina
Helios Suns players